Area codes 205 and 659 are telephone area codes in the North American Numbering Plan (NANP) for the western and central parts of the U.S. State of Alabama, including the cities of Birmingham and Tuscaloosa.

Area code 205 was one of the original North American area codes created in 1947 when AT&T created the first continental telephone numbering plan. The numbering plan area comprised the entire state, making Alabama one of 34 states served by a single area code. By the 1990s, 205 was nearing exhaustion of central office prefixes due to the state's growth and the proliferation of cell phones and pagers. In 1995, area code 334 was created to serve the area from Montgomery southward, reducing the geographic extent of 205. The numbering plan area was further reduced in 1998, when the northern and eastern portions were assigned area code 256. 

In October 2019, area code 659 was added as a second area code to the 205 numbering plan area, creating as an overlay plan for the region. This change mandated ten-digit dialing for all calls.

Service area
Counties:

Bibb (most; part of Bibb County is in area code 334)
Blount
Chilton (most; part of Chilton County is in area code 334)
Choctaw
Etowah (part; most of Etowah County is in area code 256/area code 938)
Fayette
Franklin (part; most of Franklin County is in area code 256/area code 938)
Greene
Hale
Jefferson
Lamar
Marion
Perry
Pickens
St. Clair
Shelby
Sumter
Tuscaloosa
Walker
Winston

Cities and towns:

 Alabaster
 Birmingham
 Bessemer
 Brent
 Brilliant
 Butler
 Calera
 Carbon Hill
 Centreville
 Chelsea
 Clanton
 Columbiana
 Double Springs
 Eutaw
 Fairfield
 Fayette
 Fultondale
 Gardendale
 Gilbertown
 Greensboro
 Guin
 Haleyville
 Hamilton
 Helena
 Homewood
 Hoover
 Hueytown
 Irondale
 Jasper
 Jemison
 Leeds
 Lisman
 Livingston
 Montevallo
 Moundville
 Mountain Brook
 Needham
 Northport
 Oneonta
 Pelham
 Pell City
 Pennington
 Pleasant Grove 
 Silas
 Sumiton
 Toxey
 Trussville
 Tuscaloosa
 Vestavia Hills
 Vincent
 Warrior
 Winfield
 York

See also
List of Alabama area codes
List of NANP area codes

References

External links

Telecommunications-related introductions in 1947
205
205